In fluid dynamics, aerodynamic potential flow codes or panel codes are used to determine the fluid velocity, and subsequently the pressure distribution, on an object.  This may be a simple two-dimensional object, such as a circle or wing, or it may be a three-dimensional vehicle.

A series of singularities as sources, sinks, vortex points and doublets are used to model the panels and wakes.  These codes may be valid at subsonic and supersonic speeds.

History 
Early panel codes were developed in the late 1960s to early 1970s.  Advanced panel codes, such as Panair (developed by Boeing), were first introduced in the late 1970s, and gained popularity as computing speed increased.  Over time, panel codes were replaced with higher order panel methods and subsequently CFD (Computational Fluid Dynamics).  However, panel codes are still used for preliminary aerodynamic analysis as the time required for an analysis run is significantly less due to a decreased number of elements.

Assumptions 
These are the various assumptions that go into developing potential flow panel methods:
 Inviscid
 Incompressible 
 Irrotational 
 Steady 

However, the incompressible flow assumption may be removed from the potential flow derivation leaving: 
 Potential flow (inviscid, irrotational, steady)

Derivation of panel method solution to potential flow problem 
 From Small Disturbances
 (subsonic)

 From Divergence Theorem

 Let Velocity U be a twice continuously differentiable function in a region of volume V in space.  This function is the stream function .
 Let P be a point in the volume V
 Let S be the surface boundary of the volume V.

As Q goes from inside V to the surface of V, 
 Therefore:

For :, where the surface normal points inwards.

This equation can be broken down into both a source term and a doublet term.

The Source Strength at an arbitrary point Q is:

The Doublet Strength at an arbitrary point Q is:

The simplified potential flow equation is:

With this equation, along with applicable boundary conditions, the potential flow problem may be solved.

Required boundary conditions 
The velocity potential on the internal surface and all points inside V (or on the lower surface S) is 0.

The Doublet Strength is:

The velocity potential on the outer surface is normal to the surface and is equal to the freestream velocity.

These basic equations are satisfied when the geometry is a 'watertight' geometry.  If it is watertight, it is a well-posed problem.  If it is not, it is an ill-posed problem.

Discretization of potential flow equation 
The potential flow equation with well-posed boundary conditions applied is:

Note that the  integration term is evaluated only on the upper surface, while th  integral term is evaluated on the upper and lower surfaces.

The continuous surface S may now be discretized into discrete panels.  These panels will approximate the shape of the actual surface.  This value of the various source and doublet terms may be evaluated at a convenient point (such as the centroid of the panel).  Some assumed distribution of the source and doublet strengths (typically constant or linear) are used at points other than the centroid.  A single source term s of unknown strength  and a single doublet term m of unknown strength  are defined at a given point.

where:

Methods for discretizing panels 
 constant strength - simple, large number of panels required
 linear varying strength - reasonable answer, little difficulty in creating well-posed problems
 quadratic varying strength - accurate, more difficult to create a well-posed problem

Some techniques are commonly used to model surfaces.
 Body Thickness by line sources
 Body Lift by line doublets
 Wing Thickness by constant source panels
 Wing Lift by constant pressure panels
 Wing-Body Interface by constant pressure panels

Methods of determining pressure 
Once the Velocity at every point is determined, the pressure can be determined by using one of the following formulas.  All various Pressure coefficient methods produce results that are similar and are commonly used to identify regions where the results are invalid.

Pressure Coefficient is defined as:

The Isentropic Pressure Coefficient is:

The Incompressible Pressure Coefficient is:

The Second Order Pressure Coefficient is:

The Slender Body Theory Pressure Coefficient is:

The Linear Theory Pressure Coefficient is:

The Reduced Second Order Pressure Coefficient is:

What panel methods cannot do 

Panel methods are inviscid solutions. You will not capture viscous effects except via user "modeling" by changing the geometry.
Solutions are invalid as soon as the flow changes locally from subsonic to supersonic (i.e. the critical Mach number has been exceeded) or vice versa.

Potential flow software

See also 
Stream function
Conformal mapping
Velocity potential
Divergence theorem
Joukowsky transform
Potential flow
Circulation
Biot–Savart law

Notes

References
 Public Domain Aerodynamic Software, A Panair Distribution Source, Ralph Carmichael
 Panair Volume I, Theory Manual, Version 3.0, Michael Epton, Alfred Magnus, 1990 Boeing
 Panair Volume II, Theory Manual, Version 3.0, Michael Epton, Alfred Magnus, 1990 Boeing
 Panair Volume III, Case Manual, Version 1.0, Michael Epton, Kenneth Sidewell, Alfred Magnus, 1981 Boeing
 Panair Volume IV, Maintenance Document, Version 3.0, Michael Epton, Kenneth Sidewell, Alfred Magnus, 1991 Boeing
 Recent Experience in Using Finite Element Methods For The Solution Of Problems In Aerodynamic Interference, Ralph Carmichael, 1971 NASA Ames Research Center
 

Fluid dynamics